The Western European winter storm March 2013 was a late season snow event that affected Southern England, Belgium, Northern France and Germany on 12 March 2013. It was notable for its effects particularly in Northern France where snowfall totals reached .

Overview and Impacts
Heavy snow and high winds were experienced in many northern and western countries in Europe.

Germany
This was enough to close the airport for a time during the day and more than 200 flights were scrapped by late morning. Also on an autobahn north of Frankfurt, heavy snow contributed to an enormous vehicle-pile involving more than 100 cars and injuring at least 20 people.

France
Also, it was cold too with the maximum temperature in Paris being just . The heavy snow and high winds led to nearly a third of France's regions being on alert and the government activated a ministerial crisis group. More than 2,000 people were stranded in their cars overnight as heavy snow paralysed roads in Normandy and Brittany, with many spending the night in emergency shelters. Also, about 80,000 homes in the north and northwest of France were without power. The snow caused major disruptions as it moved into Paris, with authorities urging the seven million commuters who use public transport every day to stay home. Several major roads around the capital were closed and the city's two main airports, Charles de Gaulle and Orly, said they had cancelled up to a quarter of flights and the nearby Beauvais airport, serving mainly low-cost airlines, cancelled all flights. Conditions were also very difficult on the roads, a traffic accident near Lille injured 14 people. Also 58-year-old homeless man was found dead, presumably from the cold, outside a building in the town of Saint-Brieuc in Brittany.

England
Hundreds were also stuck in their cars overnight in Southern England, some for more than 10 hours as ice, snow and freezing winds descended on southeastern England.

Belgium and The Netherlands
In Belgium, the snowstorms caused massive traffic disruptions, with vehicles backed up on 1,600 kilometres (1,000 miles) of freeways due to snowdrifts and ice. Buses and trains were cancelled or delayed in Brussels and other towns and the high-speed Thalys service linking Paris and Brussels was suspended. Long traffic jams because of snow and ice also snaked along motorways in the southern Netherlands, hampering travel to and from Belgium after an unseasonal fall of more than 10 centimetres (four inches) of snow overnight.

References

Weather events in the United Kingdom